WAIY-LP (107.7 FM) is a radio station licensed to serve the community of Belchertown, Massachusetts. The station is owned by Dwight Chapel Inc. It airs a contemporary inspirational music format.

The station was assigned the WAIY-LP call letters by the Federal Communications Commission on January 13, 2015.

References

External links
 Official Website
 

AIY-LP
Radio stations established in 2015
2015 establishments in Massachusetts
Contemporary Christian radio stations in the United States
Hampshire County, Massachusetts
AIY-LP